Auxerrois is a historical province of France. Named after the city of Auxerre in Burgundy, it gives its name to several grape varieties:
 
 Auxerrois Blanc, a white wine grape that is widely grown in Alsace, and also in Lorraine, Germany and Luxembourg
 Malbec (or Côt), a red wine grape grown in the Cahors region of France, where it is known as Auxerrois
 Pinot gris, sometimes called Auxerrois Gris in France
 Valdiguié, known as Gros Auxerrois in the South of France